Thomas Bernthal is the founder and former CEO of a strategic consulting agency, Kelton Global, and former NBC News producer.

Early life 
Bernthal was born in Washington, D.C., to Joan Lurie (née Marx) and Eric Lawrence "Rick" Bernthal, a former lawyer with Latham & Watkins LLP and currently chair of the board of directors for the US Humane Society. His paternal grandfather was musician and producer Murray Bernthal. He has two brothers, Jon, an actor, and Nicholas, an orthopedic surgeon and professor at UCLA. Bernthal and his family are Jewish.

Bernthal grew up in Cabin John, Maryland. He attended the Sidwell Friends School.

Career 
Bernthal began his career working at the White House's Communication Office during the Bill Clinton administration. Following this stint, he worked as a news producer and journalist for NBC News. During his six years with NBC, Bernthal produced segments for the Today Show, Nightly News, Dateline, MSNBC and CNBC and won three Emmy Awards for his work.

In 2000, Bernthal moved to Los Angeles, where he continued to work for NBC before founding his own marketing and consulting agency in 2002, Kelton Global. He is a former CEO of the organization.

Personal life 
Bernthal was divorced and has three children.

Bernthal began dating Facebook COO Sheryl Sandberg in the spring of 2019. The two were engaged in February 2020, and were married in August 2022.

References 

Living people
Businesspeople from Washington, D.C.
Sidwell Friends School alumni
People from Montgomery County, Maryland
American chief executives
University of Wisconsin–Madison alumni
21st-century American Jews
Year of birth missing (living people)